Tyler Cook (born September 23, 1997) is an American professional basketball player for the Salt Lake City Stars of the NBA G League. He played college basketball for the Iowa Hawkeyes.

Early life and high school career
Cook has an older brother. Cook played for Chaminade College Preparatory School alongside Jayson Tatum. As a senior, the duo led the team to a state title, where Cook scored 17 points in the championship game. In 2015, Cook announced his intentions to attend the University of Iowa.

College career
He entered the starting lineup straight away during his freshman season but fractured his right index finger in November and missed seven games. He averaged 12.3 points and 5.3 rebounds per game on a team that reached the NIT. During his sophomore season he averaged 15.3 points and 6.8 rebounds per game. In March 2018, Cook submitted paperwork for early entry into the 2018 NBA draft, but did not hire an agent.

Cook scored 26 points as the Hawkeyes defeated Connecticut to win the 2K Classic tournament. He had another 26 as Iowa beat their rivals Iowa State. Cook missed a game against Northwestern on January 9, 2019 with a knee injury, though the team won without him. As a junior, Cook led Iowa to the NCAA tournament and averaged 14.5 points and 7.6 rebounds per game. Cook declared for the NBA draft and hired a agent.

Professional career

Cleveland Cavaliers (2019–2020)
After going undrafted in the 2019 NBA draft, Cook signed a partially guaranteed contract with the Denver Nuggets. On August 13, 2019, Cook signed a two-way contract with the Nuggets. However, he was later released on October 16, 2019 during training camp. Cook was later claimed off waivers by the Cleveland Cavaliers on October 19. On January 3, 2020, the Cavaliers announced that they had converted the two-way contract with Cook to a standard NBA contract. On January 6, the Cavaliers announced that they had waived Cook. On January 9, Cook was re-signed by the Cavaliers, and immediately assigned to the Canton Charge. On January 20, the Cavaliers announced that they had signed a second 10-day contract with Cook.

Canton Charge (2020)
Cook's contract was not renewed when the second 10-day deal expired. He rejoined the Charge.

Oklahoma City Blue (2020)
On February 16, 2020, the Oklahoma City Blue announced that they had acquired Cook with a first-round draft pick and a second-round draft pick in 2020 NBA G League draft from the Canton Charge in exchange of Vincent Edwards and two 2020 first-round draft picks. On February 26, Cook registered 19 points, two rebounds, one assist, one steal and one block in a 128–115 win over the Northern Arizona Suns.

Denver Nuggets (2020)
On June 30, 2020, the Denver Nuggets announced that they had signed Cook to a two-way contract.

Iowa Wolves (2021)
On November 30, 2020, the Minnesota Timberwolves announced that they had signed Cook, but on December 19, 2020, the Timberwolves waived Cook. On January 8, 2021, the Iowa Wolves announced that they had acquired the returning right to Cook and the 17th overall pick in the first 2021 NBA G League draft from the Oklahoma City Blue for the returning right to James Webb III and the 7th overall pick in the 2021 draft.

Brooklyn Nets (2021)
On February 24, 2021, Cook was signed to a 10-day contract by the Brooklyn Nets.

Detroit Pistons (2021)
On March 19, 2021, Cook was signed to a 10-day contract by the Detroit Pistons, and on March 29, he signed a second 10-day contract. Finally, on April 7, he signed a multi-year contract.

On July 31, 2021, Cook was waived by the Pistons.

Chicago Bulls (2021–2022)
On September 8, 2021, Cook signed with the Chicago Bulls and on October 18, they converted  his deal into a two-way contract with the Windy City Bulls of the NBA G League.

Salt Lake City Stars (2022–present)
On October 23, 2022, Cook joined the Salt Lake City Stars training camp roster.

Career statistics

NBA

Regular season

|-
| style="text-align:left;"|
| style="text-align:left;"|Cleveland
| 11 || 0 || 3.2 || .700 ||  || .833 || .9 || .1 || .1 || .0 || 1.7
|-
| style="text-align:left;"|
| style="text-align:left;"|Denver
| 2 || 0 || 9.5 || .500 ||  || 1.000 || 2.0 || .0 || 1.0 || .0 || 2.0
|-
| style="text-align:left;"|
| style="text-align:left;"|Brooklyn
| 4 || 0 || 4.3 || .333 ||  ||  || .5 || .5 || .0 || .0 || .5
|-
| style="text-align:left;"| 
| style="text-align:left;"| Detroit
| 28 || 1 || 15.0 || .680 || .500 || .486 || 3.3 || .5 || .3 || .1 || 5.5
|-
| style="text-align:left;"| 
| style="text-align:left;"| Chicago
| 20 || 2 || 10.0 || .605 || — || .656 || 2.7 || .2 || .2 || .2 || 3.4
|- class="sortbottom"
| style="text-align:center;" colspan="2"|Career
| 65 || 3 || 10.6 || .654 || .500 || .600 || 2.5 || .3 || .2 || .1 || 3.8

Playoffs

|-
| style="text-align:left;"|2020
| style="text-align:left;"|Denver
| 1 || 0 || 4.0 ||  ||  ||  || 2.0 || .0 || .0 || .0 || .0
|- class="sortbottom"
| style="text-align:center;" colspan="2"|Career
| 1 || 0 || 4.0 ||  ||  ||  || 2.0 || .0 || .0 || .0 || .0

College

|-
| style="text-align:left;"| 2016–17
| style="text-align:left;"| Iowa
| 27 || 26 || 24.5 || .554 || .250 || .598 || 5.3 || 1.0 || .7 || .4 || 12.3
|-
| style="text-align:left;"| 2017–18
| style="text-align:left;"| Iowa
| 33 || 33 || 28.0 || .566 || .143 || .661 || 6.8 || 1.8 || .6 || .6 || 15.3
|-
| style="text-align:left;"| 2018–19
| style="text-align:left;"| Iowa
| 33 || 33 || 30.8 || .510 || .000 || .644 || 7.6 || 2.4 || .7 || .5 || 14.5
|- class="sortbottom"
| style="text-align:center;" colspan="2"| Career
| 93 || 92 || 28.0 || .542 || .143 || .639 || 6.7 || 1.8 || .7 || .5 || 14.1

References

External links

 Iowa Hawkeyes bio
 College statistics at Sports-Reference.com

1997 births
Living people
American men's basketball players
Basketball players from St. Louis
Brooklyn Nets players
Canton Charge players
Chicago Bulls players
Cleveland Cavaliers players
Denver Nuggets players
Detroit Pistons players
Iowa Hawkeyes men's basketball players
Iowa Wolves players
Oklahoma City Blue players
Power forwards (basketball)
Salt Lake City Stars players
Undrafted National Basketball Association players
Windy City Bulls players